Bilaspur, also known as "The City of Festivals", is a city located in Bilaspur District in the Indian state of Chhattisgarh. Bilaspur is the Administrative headquarters of the Bilaspur District and Bilaspur Division. The Chhattisgarh High Court, located at Bodri, District Bilaspur has privileged it with the title Nyayadhani (Law Capital) of the State.  This city is the commercial center and business hub of North East Chhattisgarh region. It is also an important city for the Indian Railways, as it is the headquarters for South East Central Railway Zone (SECR) and the Bilaspur Railway Division. Bilaspur is also the headquarters of South Eastern Coalfields Limited. Chhattisgarh biggest power plant operated by NTPC is in Sipat. PowerGrid in Sipat pools electricity from other power plants in region and transmits electricity to Delhi via one of longest HVDC line.

Bilaspur is known for its aromatic rice variety named ‘Doobraj’ rice, Handloom woven colourful soft Kosa silk sarees. Basic Tasar Silkworm Seed Organisation (BTSSO) under the Central Silk Board, Government of India collects, executes the production and supply of nucleus and basic Tasar seed from surrounding areas.

Bilaspur is one of the 100 Indian cities to be developed as a Smart city under the Smart Cities Mission.

History 
Historically, Bilaspur was part of Dakshina Kosala and was near capital of Malhar, Chhattisgarh (ancient Mallar), Sirpur (ancient Shripura), Tuman (ancient Tummana), and Ratanpur (ancient Ratnapura). From 5th Century onwards it was controlled by the Kalachuri dynasty of Ratanpur. Ratanpur was historical capital of Chhatisgarh state for many different dynasty. Bilaspur city, however, came into prominence around 1741, the year of the Maratha Empire rule, when a Maratha official took up his abode there to control dynasty of Ratanpur.

The management of Bilaspur district was taken over by the British East India Company  in 1818 after Bhosale lost territory in Third Anglo-Maratha War. Under Bhosale of the Nagpur kingdom there were many subedars or zamindars/landlords like Akbar Khan, Vazeer Khan, Sao and others in Bilaspur.

Bilaspur district was constituted in 1861, followed by Bilaspur municipality in 1867. Famines in the Bilaspur district were recorded by the British administration in 1828–9, 1834–5, 1845–6, 1868–9 and 1899–1900. In 1868-9 and 1899–1900, the rains failed almost completely, resulting in severe distress, migration and desertion of villages. After the 1868-9 famine there was prosperity for the next 25 years; but in 1895 there was a very poor harvest, followed in 1896 by a complete failure of crops, and severe famine continued throughout 1897. In that year the mortality rate was as high as one in six people. The famine of 1897 was followed by two favorable years; but in 1899 the monsoon failed completely and the rice crop was wholly destroyed.

Guru Ghasidas (1756–1836) started a religious movement, Satnamis (meaning the worshippers of Satnam(not related to Sikhism)), between 1820 and 1830 primarily around the Sonakhan forests. This religious movement preached against idol-worship, and instead stressed that God is synonymous with truth. His community was a farming community. The university at Bilaspur is named after him as Guru Ghasidas University.

Railways arrived at Bilaspur in the decade 1880–90, with the arrival of the Bengal Nagpur Railway. In 1888 Mistri Jagmal Gangji and other Mistri Railway Contractors laid the first railway tracks from Rajnandgaon to Bilaspur, and in that same year fellow Kutchi contractor Khoda Ramji and others built the line from Bilaspur to Jharsuguda, including the bridge over the Champa river.

In 1890, the present railway station and yard were constructed by the Gujarati railway contractor Jagmal Gangji. His son Mulji Jagmal Sawaria was later given the title of "Rao Sahib" by the British for his contribution to the development of the town, railways and the district. Jagmal Block and Jagmal Chowk in the city are named after Jagmal Gangji Sawaria.

In 1901, the population of Bilaspur was 18,937 and it was the eighth-largest town in the Central Provinces of British India. In 1908, weaving of tasar silk and cotton clothes were recorded as the major industries of Bilaspur.

Etymology 

Historical records like Imperial Gazetteer of India, Vol 8, 1908 note that the city is said to be named after a fisherwoman by the name of "Bilasa" in the 17th century, and for a long period it consisted only of a few fishermen's huts. Another book like [The highlands of central India, James Forsyth, 1889] states that Bilaspur is named after 'Palash' tree butea frondosa which are found in abundance in the area.

Geography 
It has an average elevation of 264 metres (866 ft).

Bilaspur is situated on the banks of the rain-fed Arpa River, which originates from the Maikal Range of Central India. It's a dolomite rich region surrounded by dense forests in the north and the coal mines of the Hasdeo Valley in the east.

Bilaspur District is surrounded by Koria District in the north, Anuppur District of Madhya Pradesh, Mungeli and, Baloda Bazar-Bhata Para District in the south and Korba and Janjgir-Champa District in the east.

Major cities around Bilaspur are:
 Raipur in South-West
 Nagpur in West
Bhopal in West
 Jabalpur in North-West
 Durg-Bhilai in South-West
 Varanasi and Allahabad in North
 Ranchi and Jharsuguda in North-East

Climate 
The climate in Bilaspur, Chhattisgarh has been colder than the Raipur region for the winters in December (minimum temperature 6 °C, 42 °F in the last week of December annually, while some areas have even reported temperature going down as low as 3-4 °C, 37 °F), which resembles northern Chhattisgarh. However most of the winter goes mild and pleasant. The city experiences moderate rains in the monsoon. The summers are relatively hot and dry, with maximum temperature 48+ °C, 113 °F.

Demographics 
 India census, Bilaspur Municipal Corp had a population of 365,579. Bilaspur urban area population was estimated at 652,851. In August 2019, adjacent 18 towns and sub-urban areas were included in the Bilaspur Municipal Corporation. Males constitute 51% of the population and females 49%. Bilaspur has an average literacy rate of 91.29%, higher than the national average of 59.5%; with male literacy of 92.94% and female literacy of 88.33%. 15% of the population is under 6 years of age.

According to the 2011 census, Bilaspur District, Chhattisgarh has a population of 2,662,077, roughly equal to the nation of Kuwait or the US state of Nevada. Bilaspur District ranks 152nd in India (out of a total of 640). Its population growth rate over the decade 2001–2011 was 33.21%.	Bilaspur	has a sex ratio of 	972	females for every 1000 males, and a literacy rate of 71.59%.

The main languages spoken are Chhattisgarhi, Hindi.

Administration 

Bilaspur Division consists of seven districts -

1) Bilaspur

2) Korba

3) Raigarh

4) Janjgir-Champa

5) Mungeli

6) Gaurella-Pendra-Marwahi

7) Sakti

The district consists of 8 Tehsils - Bilaspur, Kota, Takhatpur, Bilha, Masturi, Ratanpur, Sipat, Belgahna.

Bilaspur is divided into 4 blocks namely Kota, Takhatpur, Bilha, Masturi.

The city of Bilaspur is also a Nagar nigam. It has two Nagarpalikas namely (1) Takhatpur and (2) Ratanpur. It has been categorised into four Nagar Panchayat namely (1) Bilha (2) Kota (3) Boadri and (4) Malhar.

Bilaspur City runs under the administration of the Bilaspur Municipal Corporation (BMC). Ram Sharan Yadav is the current Mayor of Bilaspur, a member of Indian National Congress Party.

Culture 

Bilaspur is rich in its cultural heritage. Bilaspur has its own dance styles, cuisine, music and traditional folk songs.  In rural areas, women wear garlands made of one rupee coins. This has gone out of fashion in recent times. The city celebrates all the major festivals of India. There are some local festivals such as the colorful Rout Dance (November), harley, and pola. The Rawat Nach Mahotsav is the folk dance festival of Bilaspur celebrated by Rawat tribes.

The town has been the home of several literary, theatre, arts personalities including Makhan Lal Chaturvedi, Satyadev Dubey, Bimal Mitra, Shrikant Verma.

Utility services 
Over the years, Bilaspur has developed many 4 – lane and 6 – lane roads, street lighting and squares. However, the last decade has seen large-scale unregulated urbanization and residential and commercial expansion, over-straining the water resources and generally defunct civic amenities due to indifferent officials and politicians. There is a master plan for the city and surrounding areas.

Electricity is government-regulated and, as of now, no power cuts are effected, thanks to the massive expansion in energy generating capacity both by public and private companies in the energy sector.

Hospitals and Health Care Facilities 
Bilaspur is home to many hospitals & nursing homes, some run by the state government and others by the private sector. City has a government medical college named Chhattisgarh Institute of Medical Science which has 750 beds for patients. There is Apollo Hospitals in the private sector, which is 300 bedded specialty hospital. A new mental hospital is established in village Sendri (Ratanpur Road) which provides quality treatment. More than 25 Sanjivni express and Mahatari express are running in city. It also has private dental colleges in the city area.

Economy 

Bilaspur is the center of electric power generation in India. Bilaspur and the surrounding area generate 10,000 MW of electricity, and an additional 50,000 MW are planned in the next few years. As many as 22 companies are interested to tap an estimated power generation potential of 50,000 megawatts in the region. The railways have gotten a major boost with big energy sector players set to invest Rs.5,000 crore in three proposed railways corridors around Bilaspur. Chhattisgarh is also known as "The Rice Bowl" – Dhan ka katora. Bilaspur is the centre of agri products. There are approx. 500 rice and dall mills in the surrounding area. In FY2022/21, the South East Central Railway zone, whose geography encompasses Bilaspur, earned Rs 14,2855.71 crore, "the highest among all of the railway divisians of Indian Railways". The Bilaspur railways zone comprises the divisions of Bilaspur, Nagpur and Raipur. South Eastern Coalfields Limited (SECL), a subsidiary of Public Sector Unit Coal India Limited (CIL) – A Maharatna Company, is situated with headquarters at Bilaspur. SECL is a Miniratna PSU under the Ministry of Coal, with several awards in its credentials including best PSU award in 1997–98. An integrated action plan for development of civic infrastructure, including hi-tech water purifier system, proper drainage facilities and cleanliness, is being planned by the state government for cities and towns, while the proposed 'Arpa Project' would give a new life to the city of Bilaspur, minister for urban administration and health Amar Agrawal said in an interview to the Times of India, a leading newspaper of India. The State Government has drawn up an ambitious plan of Rs2,000 crore to develop the Arpa river bank in Bilaspur district during the next seven years. For this, the Government has constituted a ‘Special Area Development Authority’ (SADA) for the development of the Arpa river bank near Bilaspur city.

The Government has invited proposals from interested national and international institutions for the development of the river bank on a PPP model. The Authority has prepared a project for the development of the river and is now in search of organisations that would be interested in developing the river on a Public Private Partnership (PPP).

According to SADA, about 653 hectares of area on the banks of the river would be developed. This area is 13.4 km in length. Commercial, residential, entertainment and other institutional facilities would be developed in this area. On both the sides of the river, 13.4-km-long retaining wall, houses and commercial complexes would be constructed, besides bridge, roads and walkways. Water supply, sewerage, drainage, electricity supply would be provided in the area.

The estimated cost of all the works is Rs2,000 crore. The development works would be taken up in phases during the next seven years.

Of the total 653-hectare area, some of the land is owned privately. In lieu of acquisition of private land, the affected people would be given land at other areas. After development about 267 hectares of land will be made available for sale. By selling this land, the developer could recover the invested amount. The downtown is called Gol Bazaar (Circular Market). Gol Bazaar, Sadar Bazaar and company Garden Chowk are buzzing and vibrant but overcrowded with slow-moving traffic. In contrast there are some newly developed areas as well. The Vyapar Vihar is a newly developed commercial and goods transport area. Bilaspur has Chhattisgarh's first hi-tech bus stand at Bodri.

It has the High Court of Chhattisgarh which is Asia's largest court (in area).
 Industries: Around Bilaspur, there are many industrial areas, including Tifra, Sirgitti and Silpahri Industrial Growth Centres. Sirgitti, Silpahri and Tifra around Bilapur are major industrial areas near Bilaspur. Located on the outskirts of Bilaspur city Sirgitti Industrial Centre is spread over an area of approx. 338 hectares. With about 324 industries it provides direct employment to 4431 persons. Silpahari Industrial Centre is another industrial area near Bilaspur and is home to many sponge iron industries. Tifra Industrial Area situated on the outskirts of Bilaspur city is spread over an area of approx. 65 hectares. Many chemical, PVC footwear, HDPE woven sacks, polythene bags and sheets, soft drinks and other units are located here. CSIDC or Chhattisgarh State Industrial Development Corporation Limited is responsible for the development of maintenance of all these industrial areas in and around Bilaspur. Chhattisgarh Laghu Evam Sahayak Udyog Sangh or CLSUS is an association of industries which represents all major industries of Bilaspur and Chhattisgarh. BEC Fertilizers – a unit of Bhilai Engineering Corporation is situated in the Sirgitti Industrial Area.
 Power plants – Bilaspur has India's second largest power plant of NTPC at Sipat which generates power of 2980 MW with 3 units of 660 MW each and 1 unit of 1000 MW. Many thermal power plants are coming up in the surrounding area of Bilaspur. Also notable are Nova, KSK, Gitanjali, Mahanadi etc.
 Legal: The day the state of Chhattisgarh was constituted (1 November 2000) with its capital at Raipur, the High Court of Chhattisgarh was established at Bilaspur. It is the 19th high court of India.
 Banks: All major Indian banks have branches and ATMs in the city. SBI have approx. 80 ATMs in the city as of 2013.
 Website: A website dedicated to provide information on Bilaspur is maintained by NIC.
 A new Indoor stadium is under construction at Behtarai Road.

Transport

Roadways

Bilaspur is well-connected with a network of national highways intersecting it. The national highways are National Highway 130 (NH-130) connecting Bilaspur with Ambikapur and Raipur directly, National Highway 130A (NH-130A), National Highway 45 (NH-45) and National Highway 49 (NH-49). The proposed Narmada Expressway will start from Bilaspur, and will run till Ahmedabad, along the route of the Narmada River. Once completed, it will help to enhance connectivity and commute from Bilaspur to neighbouring states, and will also provide direct connectivity to the national and the financial capitals of India, as well as with Madhya Pradesh, via the Delhi–Mumbai Expressway and other expressways. The following table provides the routes of the national highways mentioned above:

Rail

The nearest railway station is Bilaspur Junction railway station, which is the divisional headquarter of the South East Central Railway zone of the Indian Railways. 

It is the busiest junction of Chhattisgarh, and the second busiest of central India after Itarsi station. It is the third cleanest railway station in India after Surat and Rajkot stations. It is well connected with the rest of the country, as it lies on the Tatanagar–Bilaspur section of the Howrah–Nagpur–Mumbai line and a junction, as another line goes towards Delhi via Katni. The station has the fifth longest railway platform in India after Hubballi, Gorakhpur, Kollam and Kharagpur stations. The Bilaspur Rajdhani Express is the train that connects Bilaspur with the national capital every two days in a week. 

Because of the station's location, daily connections are available for Kolkata, Mumbai, New Delhi, Pune, Nagpur, Ahmedabad, Indore, Bhopal, Amritsar, Agra, Roorkee, Haridwar, Visakhapatnam, Bhubaneswar, Puri, Jamshedpur, Patna, Jabalpur, Raipur, Varanasi, Jaipur, Bikaner, Udaipur, Ajmer, Thiruvananthapuram, Kollam, Chennai, Ernakulam, Tirupati, Tirunelveli, Bangalore, Bhuj, Gandhidham, Okha, Porbandar, Dhanbad, Hyderabad, Jaipur, Gorakhpur, Shirdi, Udaipur, Bikaner, Jammu, Jodhpur, Kanpur, Lucknow, Ranchi, Guwahati among many other cities throughput India. For services within the state, daily local trains run to all cities of the state.

Bus transport
The Bilaspur Bus Station is the main bus station of the city. It is also known as Hi-tech Bus Stand. It is well connected with other cities within and outside the state. Daily bus services are operated by government and private operators to cities like Jashpur, Ambikapur, Raipur, Jagdalpur, Korba, Nagpur, Durg, Bhilai, Mungeli, Kawardha, Raigarh, Narayanpur, Kondagaon, Jabalpur, Varanasi, Prayagraj, Nagpur, Gondia, Mandla, Anuppur, Shehdol, Jharsuguda, Sambalpur, Bhawanipatna, Hyderabad, among others.

Air

Currently, there are direct flights from the airport to Jabalpur, Bhopal, Delhi and Prayagraj, operated by Alliance Air.

Tourism

Natural attractions
The Achanakmar-Amarkantak Biosphere Reserve is the prime tourist attraction of Bilaspur, and has been recognized by the UNESCO for its dramatic and ecologically diverse landscape. It is reputed to have some of the densest forests in the country and an even spread of hills and rivers. One of the places worth visiting within the biosphere reserve is the Achanakmar Wildlife Sanctuary. Home to a wide variety of wildlife, the sanctuary is spread over an area of 551 km2 (213 mi2), and was set up in 1975 under the Wildlife Protection Act. The sanctuary is 55 km (34 mi) away from Bilaspur, and remains closed during the monsoon season.

Just before entry into 
the sanctuary, is the Ghongapani Dam. Beyond the sanctuary, for accommodation, on the way to Amarkantak, there are government guest houses in Achanakmar, Keonchi and Lamni. These guest houses can be booked with governmental officials in the district headquarters, also by booking only from their official websites. The forest guest housed at Lamni were built by the British. It is 1,850 feet above sea level, and was built in June 1913.

In the sanctuary, the presence of animals like the Guar (Indian bison) and tigers are in high numbers, as reported by multiple sightings by visitors. Other animals include leopards, Chitals, panthers, striped hyenas, canis', sloth bears, Dholes, Sambar deers, Nilgais, Indian four-horned antelopes and chinkaras, which populate the sanctuary in equal numbers. Trips to the sanctuary can be organized via private taxi and bus operators.

Man-made attractions
Various archeological sites and temples in and around Bilaspur attract tourists from all over the world. There are more than 20 recognized and protected monuments and sites by the Archaeological Survey of India. Other than the Achanakmar Wildlife Sanctuary, the following are the man-made tourist attractions: 

Dams: Khutaghat dam, (55 km), known for its lush and green environment due its location in the Baghelkhand range, Khudia dam (75 km) and  Hasdev Bango Dam is (105 km) from Bilaspur, respectively. 

Malhar and Ratanpur: These two sites are one of the main centres of archeology. Ruins of forts to ancient temples are found here. Malhar is of historical significance, as it was visited by Xuanzang, the Chinese historian. In Malhar, many ancient temples have been found by excavations, such as Pataleshwar temple, Devri temple and Dindeshwari temple. The four-handed idol of Lord Vishnu is also significant as it is the earliest sculptural representation, dating back to approx. 1000 BCE, to the Ratnapura–Kalachuri Regime. Malhar has a museum too for providing knowledge and information to tourists and interested people, maintained by the Archaeological Survey of India.

 

As Bilaspur is situated on the banks of the Arpa river, Leelagar and Maniyari are other small rivers of the district, where there are accommodation facilities, out of which most of these facilities are under development to promote tourism along the river areas. 

This is also the place where the Sone River originates from. 

Kanan Pendari Zoological Garden: Located within city limits.

Bhartiya Nagar: Known for its Shri Aiyyappa Mandir, located near Tifra flyover, within city limits.

Smriti Vatika: A lush, green, planned garden, located just before the entrance of the Kanan Pendari Zoological Garden, in the city.

 Rani Sati Temple: A religious temple built in within Bilaspur made by the Marwaris, where the deity of Jhunjhunu's temple is worshipped.

 Two amusement parks are also located within the city. One is the Bubble Island and another is the Radhika Water Park. Smriti Van (not to be confused with Smriti Vatika, as Smriti Van is close to Bilaspur railway station) and Urja Parks are also situated in Rajkishore Nagar area of the city.

 Maa Marimai Temple is also a temple of Bilaspur.

Food 
Bilaspur is famous for food varieties, such as Doobraj rice, fara, chila, rice roll, gulgula bhajiya, angakar roti, thetri-khurmi, airsa, tamatar fatka (tomato chutney), different types of bhajis (leafy vegetables), etc. The wheat grown in the region is called sharbati (juicy) or like a sweet refreshing drink. The rotis made from the flour of this wheat are soft and tasty.

Education 

Bilaspur has developed as a centre of education for Chhattisgarh with students from all over the state coming to Bilaspur to study engineering, medical and administrative officers' competitive exams. As of 2012 Bilaspur has 5 universities. Bilaspur has following educational institutions:

Universities 
 Guru Ghasidas Vishwavidyalaya – Central University
 Atal Bihari Vajpayee Vishwavidyalaya
 Pandit Sundarlal Sharma (Open) University
 Dr. C. V. Raman University
 Maharishi University of Management and Technology

Colleges 
 Institute of Technology, Guru Ghasidas University
 Govt. E. Raghvendra Rao P.G. Science College ('A' grade)
 Chhattisgarh Institute of Medical Sciences
 Government Engineering College, Bilaspur
 S.L.T. Institute of Pharmaceutical Sciences, Guru Ghasidas University
 Thakur Chedilal Barrister College of Agriculture & Research Station, Bilaspur
 New Horizon Dental College and Research Institute
 C.M. Dubey Postgraduate College, Bilaspur
 
 Govt. Bilasa Girls P.G. College, Bilaspur
 Govt. Ayurveda College, Bilaspur
 LCIT Group of Institutions, Bilaspur
 Triveni Institute of Dental Sciences, Hospital & Research Centre

Schools 

 DAV Public School, SECL Bilaspur
 Delhi Public School, Bilaspur
 Brilliant Public School, Bilaspur
 Krishna Public School, Bilaspur
 Loyla School, Bilaspur
 St. Francis sen. sec. School, Bilaspur

Media

Print and news media
The city publishes print media newspapers in Hindi languages.

 Live Media
 Patrika
 Dainik Bhaskar
 Nava Bharat
 Hari Bhoomi
 Deshbandhu
 Swadesh News

The following electronic media channels deliver local news 24*7:
 Chhattisgarh Cable Networks (CCN)
 Grand Gumber Channel
 Siti News Channel
 Abhi Tak (CCN owned News Channel)
 Z 24 Ghante – Chhattisgarh Bilaspur Buero
 E TV M.P. CG. Bilaspur Buereu
 Sahara TV M.P. CG. Bilaspur Buereu
 P7 /Pearls News M.P. C.G. Bilaspur
 Aaj Tak, Bilaspur Buereu
 India TV, Bilaspur Buereu

Radio 
Bilaspur city has 5 FM Radio Stations which are-

TV/Doordarshan 
 Bilaspur has High Power TV Transmitter of Doordarshan at Bahatarai

Web portals

Notable people 
 Leslie Claudius, former Olympic field hockey player. He has distinction of being one of only two Indian players to win four Olympic medals
 Balakrishna Shivram Moonje (B. S. Moonje) was a leader of the Hindu Mahasabha
 Satyadev Dubey, Padmabhushan, theater director, actor, playwright, screenwriter. He directed Amrish Puri in Andha Yug and known for Junoon (1979), Bhumika (1977) and Aakrosh (1980) 
 Makhanlal Chaturvedi wrote Pushp ki Abhilaashaa in Bilaspur Central Jail when he was prison by British for sedition charges.
 Bimal Mitra was a renowned Bengali writer with more than one hundred novels and short stories. One of his most popular novel Shaheb Bibi Golam was adopted in Hindi movie. He served in railways in Bilaspur for long year.
 Sandeep Shrivastava is screenwriter, lyricist know for his works in movie like Shershaah, Ludo, New York, Ab Tak Chhappan etc.
 Bilasa Devi, founder of Bilaspur city and amazon of Chhattisgarh 
 Satyajeet Dubey, voice and film actor
 Ajit Jogi, first chief minister of the state of Chhattisgarh
Ingrid Mcleod, a nominated Lok Sabha member representing India's Anglo-Indian community
 Shrikant Verma, a noted poet and Member of Parliament 
 Arun Sao, elected (2019) MP (Member of Parliament) from Bilaspur Lok Sabha seat.

References 

The census has been taken from Hari Bhoomi Bilaspur Bhaskar Edition dated 23/12/2013.

External links 

 
 
 Map of Bilaspur, Chhattisgarh

 
Cities and towns in Bilaspur district, Chhattisgarh